Koli-ye Olya or Kali-ye Olya may refer to:
 Koli-ye Olya, Ardabil
 Kali-ye Olya, East Azerbaijan